Stefani may refer to:

Places 
 Stefani, Boeotia, a settlement in Boeotia, Greece
 Stefani, Corinthia, a village in the municipal unit of Tenea
 Stefani, Preveza, a village in the municipality of Louros, Preveza regional unit, Greece
 Stefani, Trikala, a village in the municipality of Kalampaka, Trikala regional unit, Greece

Other uses 
 Stefani (name)
 4624 Stefani (1982 FV2), a main-belt asteroid
 Agenzia Stefani, an Italian news agency
 , a Hansa A Type cargo ship in service 1964-44

See also 
 
 Stephanie (disambiguation)
 Stefan (disambiguation)
 Stephani